The MirrorWorld is a planned pentalogy of fantasy novels written by German author Cornelia Funke in collaboration with Lionel Wigram. As of 2016, the first three books in the series have been published, titled Reckless, Fearless and The Golden Yarn. The series, based on 19th Century Europe, features many elements of fairy tales, notably the tales of the German Brothers Grimm. In future novels, Funke plans to include fairy tales from other cultures such as Spain, France and Russia.

Mirrorworld is Cornelia Funke's first series of novels in which she has collaborated with another person; this is because, whilst working on a script idea with Lionel Wingram, they both "discovered" the story. Funke loved the idea so much she asked Wingram if she could turn it into a novel; he agreed, but requested that he be involved in the creative process.

After deciding to work on the series, it took Funke three years to write the first novel, Reckless, due to another novel she was writing at the time. Unlike writing Inkheart and the subsequent novels in the Inkheart series, Funke did not visually base many characters on people she knew. Only Clara is based on the daughter of a Scottish friend, though her hair color is different in the book.

References

Alternate history novels
Young adult novel series
Fantasy novel series
Novels by Cornelia Funke
German bildungsromans
Novels set in the 19th century